Dark Days in Paradise is the eleventh solo studio album by Irish guitarist Gary Moore, released in 1997.

Much like his earlier album Still Got the Blues, Dark Days in Paradise represented a stark change in musical direction for Moore, eschewing the electric blues style of his preceding albums in favour of a more contemporary sound.

Track listing

The 2003 remaster did away with the one-minute pause and adds an index for the title track, but it's still not mentioned on the packaging or in the lyrics, which means the actual bonus tracks (which originally appeared on the CD single "One Good Reason" VSCDT 1632) are given as track 11 and 12 respectively on the printed tracklist.

The remaster misses several more b-sides that were released on CD singles in 1997:

There was also a promo edit of "I Have Found My Love in You", which runs almost two minutes shorter than the LP version.

Personnel
 Gary Moore – guitar, vocals
 Magnus Fiennes – keyboards, programming
 Gary Husband – drums
 Dee Lewis – backing vocals
 Phil Nicholas – keyboards, programming
 Guy Pratt – bass

References

Gary Moore albums
1997 albums
Albums produced by Chris Tsangarides
Virgin Records albums
Electronic albums by Irish artists
Experimental pop albums